Manuel Francisco Álvarez de la Peña (1727–1797), Spanish sculptor, was born at Salamanca. He followed classical models so closely that he was styled by his countrymen El Griego, "The Greek." His works, which are very numerous, are chiefly to be found at Madrid.

References

18th-century Spanish sculptors
18th-century Spanish male artists
Spanish male sculptors
1727 births
1797 deaths
People from Salamanca